The White Tiger is a 1987 novel by Robert Stuart Nathan.  The story takes place in China, after the rule of Mao Zedong. The book is divided into four parts, the titles of which are Chinese proverbs.

Plot summary
Lu Hong, a policeman in Beijing finds himself in trouble after the death in strange circumstances of his mentor, Sun Sheng.  Sheng was a friend of Hong's parents, and originally met them during the Long March with Mao Zedong from 1935 to 1948.  Hong suspects that something is hidden behind his mentor's sudden death.  He begins to look for the true story of what happened forty years ago, when his parents, Sheng and the Three Tigers were in the city of Yan'an with Mao Zedong.  However, the silence of people who know, and subsequent deaths, impede his investigation.

Main characters
 Lu Hong, policeman
 Sun Sheng, mentor of Hong
 Liu Chan, Hong's assistant
 Cui Chun, Hong's mother
 Lu Yaomin, Hong's father
 Ma Sufei, widow of Sun Sheng
 Wei Ye, director of King Kong
 Peter Ostrander, an American doctor

Locations
 Beijing
 Guangzhou
 Zhoukoudian, an archaeological site where the Peking Man was discovered
 Nanning

1987 American novels
Novels set in China